Kentucky Retirement Systems v. EEOC, 554 U.S. 135 (2008) is a United States Supreme Court case that ruled Kentucky's retirement system does not amount to age discrimination under the Age Discrimination in Employment Act when granting pensions to disabled persons who had not yet reached the permitted retirement age of 55.

Associate Justice Stephen Breyer explained in the majority opinion that "where an employer treats employees differently based on their pension status and even if the pension status does depend on age, the plaintiff still has to show that that age made a difference rather than just a pension status, that it was actually motivated this discrimination or there's a reason for it that was based upon age and not pension status."

References 

Ageism case law
United States Supreme Court cases
United States Supreme Court cases of the Roberts Court